The Last Fort is a 1928 German silent war film directed by Curtis Bernhardt and starring Rolla Norman, Maria Paudler and Albert Steinrück.

Cast
 Rolla Norman as Major Leblanc
 Maria Paudler as Yvonne, seine Tochter
 Albert Steinrück as Lensky, Kommandant
 Fritz Odemar as Lieutenant Brand
 Heinrich George as Croff
 Alexander Granach as Gestino
 Alfred Gördel as Capitän Andrieux

References

Bibliography
 Koepnick, Lutz Peter. The Dark Mirror: German Cinema Between Hitler and Hollywood. University of California Press, 2002.
 Prawer, S.S. Between Two Worlds: The Jewish Presence in German and Austrian Film, 1910–1933. Berghahn Books, 2005.

External links

1928 films
Films of the Weimar Republic
1928 war films
German silent feature films
German war films
Films directed by Curtis Bernhardt
Films set in Syria
German black-and-white films
Films produced by Seymour Nebenzal
Silent war films
1920s German films
1920s German-language films